Venerida (formerly Veneroida) is an order of mostly saltwater but also some freshwater bivalve molluscs. This order includes many familiar groups such as many clams that are valued for food and a number of freshwater bivalves.

Since the 2000s, the taxonomy currently represented in the World Register of Marine Species (WoRMS) classifies several taxa contained in the former Veneroida into other orders, such as the new Cardiida (for Cardioidea and Tellinoidea) and Carditida (cockles and their allies).

Description
Venerids are generally thick-valved, equal-valved and isomyarian (that is, their adductor muscles are of equal size). Three main hinge teeth are characteristic of the subclass Heterodonta, to which this order belongs. Many species are active rather than sessile. However, they tend to be filter feeders, feeding through paired siphons, with a characteristic folded gill structure adapted to that way of life.

In 2002, Gonzalo Giribet and Ward Wheeler suggested that the orders Myoida and Veneroida were not monophyletic. They have since been widely reorganised.

Orders and families
Order: Venerida

Superfamily: †Anthracosioidea
 Family: †Anthracosiidae
 Family: †Ferganoconchida
 Family: †Shaanxiconchidae
Superfamily: Arcticoidea
 Family: Arcticidae
 Family: †Pollicidae
 Family: Trapezidae
 Family: †Veniellidae
 Superfamily: Chamoidea
 Family: Chamidae
 Superfamily: Cyrenoidea
 Family: Cyrenidae
 Family: Cyrenoididae
 Family: Glauconomidae
 Superfamily: Glossoidea
 Family: Glossidae
 Family: Kelliellidae
 Family: †Lutetiidae
 Family: Vesicomyidae
 Superfamily: Hemidonacoidea
 Family: Hemidonacidae
 Species: Hemidonax pictus and others
 Superfamily: Mactroidea
 Family: Anatinellidae
 Family: Cardiliidae
 Family: Mactridae
 Family: Mesodesmatidae
Superfamily: Galeommatoidea
Family: Galeommatidae
Family: Kellidae
Family: Lasaeidae
Family: Leptonidae
Family: Montacutidae
Superfamily: †Palaeanodontoidea
 Family: †Palaeanodontidae
 Superfamily: †Prilukielloidea
 Family: †Prilukiellidae
 Family: †Senderzoniellidae
 Superfamily: Ungulinoidea
 Family: Ungulinidae
Superfamily: Veneroidea
 Family: †Isocyprinidae
 Family: Neoleptonidae
 Family: Veneridae

References

External links 

 Veneroida Taxonomy at the National Center for Biotechnology Information (NCBI)

 
Bivalve orders